The men's Greco-Roman 74 kilograms at the 1992 Summer Olympics as part of the wrestling program were held at the Institut Nacional d'Educació Física de Catalunya from July 27 to July 29. The wrestlers are divided into 2 groups. The winner of each group decided by a double-elimination system.

Results 
Legend
WO — Won by walkover

Elimination A

Round 1

Round 2

Round 3

Round 4

Round 5

Round 6

Summary

Elimination B

Round 1

Round 2

Round 3

Round 4

Round 5

Round 6

Summary

Finals

Final standing

References

External links
Official Report

Greco-Roman 74kg